Stranger than Fiction is the eighth full-length studio album and major label debut by American punk rock band Bad Religion, released in 1994. It was a major breakthrough for Bad Religion, being certified Gold by the Recording Industry Association of America and becoming the band's first album to chart on the Billboard 200, peaking at 87.

Release
Stranger Than Fiction was their first album released on the major label Atlantic Records (although that label re-released the previous album, Recipe for Hate), and also its last release with guitarist Brett Gurewitz, who left just prior to the album's 1994-1995 world tour, only to return to the band seven years later. On tour, Gurewitz was replaced by Brian Baker, who would stay with the band permanently.

With sales continuing  years after its release, Stranger Than Fiction is one of Bad Religion's most successful albums, featuring two of their well-known hit singles, "Infected" (released on January 6, 1995) and the re-recorded version of "21st Century (Digital Boy)", first appeared on Against the Grain. Both songs earned airplay on MTV and radio stations, such as KROQ. The album included another hit single, "Stranger Than Fiction", though the last one, "Incomplete", failed to make any national chart. The album also includes fan favorites, "Leave Mine To Me", "Tiny Voices", "The Handshake", and "Better Off Dead."  As of today, Stranger Than Fiction remains the only Bad Religion record to obtain gold status in the United States and Canada. The album was re-released by Epitaph Records on September 15, 2008.

In 2009, Rhino Records released a colored vinyl to coincide with this album's 15th anniversary.

Reception

Stranger Than Fiction was released on September 6, 1994 and became the first Bad Religion album distributed via Atlantic Records. On September 24 of that year, the album peaked at number 87 on the Billboard 200 album chart, and on March 4, 1998, also became Bad Religion's first (and only) album to be certified gold in the United States.

AllMusic's Jack Rabid praised this album as a "rare case of selling out in reverse" and  songs such as "Leave Mine to Me", "Individual", "Tiny Voices" and "Marked", calling them "all uptempo barnburners, pulverizing in their rapid passion". He also criticizes "'Infected' and 'Television'" as "the two least effective songs of their 15 years, the former a third-rate 'Sanity'", referring to the seventh track on 1989's No Control.

In November 2011, Stranger Than Fiction was ranked number one on Guitar World magazine's top ten list of guitar albums of 1994, with The Offspring's Smash in second place and Weezer's Weezer in third place. Loudwire placed Stranger Than Fiction at No. 9 on its "10 Best Hard Rock Albums of 1994" list. In July 2014, Stranger Than Fiction was featured on Guitar World magazine's "Superunknown: 50 Iconic Albums That Defined 1994" list.

Track listing

B-sides
 "Mediocrity" (Graffin) – 2:45

Personnel
 Greg Graffin – lead vocals
 Greg Hetson – guitar
 Brett Gurewitz – guitar, backing vocals
 Jay Bentley – bass guitar, backing vocals
 Bobby Schayer – drums, percussion
 Tim Armstrong of Rancid – guest vocals on "Television"
 Jim Lindberg of Pennywise – guest vocals on "Marked"
 Andy Wallace – production, mixing, organ on "Stranger Than Fiction"
 Dale Lavi – photography
 Norman Moore – art direction

Collaborations
 Wayne Kramer (of the MC5) plays lead guitar on opening track "Incomplete".
 Tim Armstrong (of Operation Ivy, Rancid and eventually The Transplants) contributed lead vocals on "Television", which Concrete Blonde's Johnette Napolitano co-wrote with Brett Gurewitz.
 Jim Lindberg (of Pennywise) contributing backing vocals on "Marked"

Re-releases
Stranger Than Fiction was re-released several times, with different labels, covers and formats in different countries (see the table below).

Charts

Weekly charts

Year-end charts

Singles - Billboard (North America)

References
Citations

Sources

External links

Stranger than Fiction at YouTube (streamed copy where licensed)

1994 albums
Albums produced by Andy Wallace (producer)
Atlantic Records albums
Bad Religion albums
Alternative rock albums by American artists